Henry Waite may refer to:

Henry Matson Waite (judge) (1787–1869), lawyer, judge, and Chief Justice of the Connecticut Supreme Court
Henry Matson Waite (engineer) (1869–1944), engineer and the City Manager of Dayton, Ohio
Henry Randall Waite (1845–1909), American editor and clergyman
H. Roy Waite (1883–1978), pioneer in aviation

See also
Henry Waitt (died 1902), American businessman